Monomorphic or Monomorphism may refer to:

Monomorphism, an injective homomorphism in mathematics
 Monomorphic QRS complex, a wave pattern seen on an electrocardiogram
 Monomorphic, a linguistic term meaning "consisting of only one morpheme"
Monomorphism (biology), when only one phenotype exists in a population of a species
Monomorphism (computer science), a programming concept

See also
 Dimorphism (disambiguation)
 Polymorphism (disambiguation)